Schlumbergerites is an genus of extinct sea cucumbers which existed in Poland during the Triassic period. The type species is Schlumbergerites sievertsae.

References

Dendrochirotacea
Prehistoric sea cucumber genera
Triassic first appearances
Jurassic extinctions